Haukar RC is an Icelandic rugby team based in Hafnarfjörður.

References